Alexander Xavier Mooney (born June 7, 1971) is an American politician serving since 2015 as the U.S. representative from . A member of the Republican Party, he represented the 3rd district in the Maryland State Senate from 1999 to 2011 and is a former chair of the Maryland Republican Party. He is the first Hispanic person elected to Congress from West Virginia.

In November 2022, Mooney filed to run for U.S. Senate in 2024, for the West Virginia seat occupied by Democrat Joe Manchin.

Early life, education, and early career
Mooney's mother, Lala, was a Cuban refugee who escaped political imprisonment at age 21, shortly after the Bay of Pigs Invasion. Her older brother is former Miami mayor Xavier Suarez, and Mooney is the cousin of Miami's current mayor, Francis X. Suarez. His great-grandparents on his father's side were Irish-born. His father, Vincent, grew up in Long Island, New York. Mooney was born in 1971 in Washington, D.C., and raised in Frederick, Maryland. He graduated from Frederick High School, where he was elected president of the student government.

In 1993, Mooney received his B.A. in philosophy from Dartmouth College. While attending Dartmouth, he ran for the New Hampshire House of Representatives in Grafton County's 10th District. He finished in last place with 8% of the vote. In 2007, Mooney was elected to the Dartmouth College Association of Alumni's executive committee. In early 2008, he traveled to New Hampshire to testify in support of a state bill that would require legislative approval for amendments that the private Board of Trustees of Dartmouth College wished to make to its charter.

After college, Mooney interned for U.S. Representative Ed Royce and then served as staff assistant to U.S. Representative Roscoe Bartlett. In 1995, he became a legislative analyst for the House Republican Conference.

Maryland Senate
From 1999 to 2011, Mooney represented Maryland's 3rd District, which covers parts of Washington and Frederick Counties, in the Maryland Senate. He served as the National Journalism Center's executive director from 2005 to 2012.

Elections
In 1998, Mooney defeated incumbent Republican John W. Derr in the primary election and Democrat Ronald S. Bird in the general election. In 2002, he was reelected, defeating Democrat Sue Hecht with 55% of the vote. In 2006, he won reelection with 52% of the vote against Candy Greenway. In 2010, Democrat Ronald N. Young, Mayor of Frederick, defeated him 51%–49%.

Committee assignments
In the Maryland State Senate, Mooney was a member of the Judicial Proceedings Committee, the Joint Committee on Investigation, the Joint Committee on Federal Relations, and the Education, Health and Environmental Affairs Committee. He served on the Maryland Rural Caucus, the Taxpayers Protection Caucus, and the Maryland Veterans Caucus.

Post-Senate career

Chair of the Maryland GOP
On December 11, 2010, Mooney was elected chair of the Maryland Republican Party. He was chair until early 2013.

2012 congressional election

Maryland's redistricting based on the 2010 census significantly redrew the boundaries of incumbent Roscoe Bartlett's 6th District. The district lost all of heavily Republican Carroll County, as well as some Republican-leaning parts of Baltimore, Frederick and Harford Counties, while gaining a heavily Democratic spur of Montgomery County. In 2008, Barack Obama took 40% of the vote in the old 6th, but would have won 56% in the new 6th. After creating an exploratory committee to challenge Bartlett in the Republican primary, Mooney decided not to run against him.

U.S. House of Representatives

Elections

2014

In March 2012, Mooney filed as a candidate in the 2014 Republican primary for Maryland's 6th congressional District. He subsequently had to withdraw his candidacy because he was still Bartlett's part-time outreach director at the time he filed to run. House ethics rules do not allow congressional staffers to remain employed in a congressional office while campaigning.

The district includes most of the West Virginia portion of the Washington media market. Seven-term Republican incumbent Shelley Moore Capito was giving up the seat to run for the United States Senate. During his campaign, some West Virginia Democrats accused Mooney of being a carpetbagger since he had recently moved to West Virginia.

Mooney received the Republican nomination on May 13, 2014, beating six other candidates. He finished first in 15 of the 17 counties in the congressional district, with 36.02% of the vote.

Mooney defeated Democrat Nick Casey in the 2014 general election, 47% to 44%. He won Berkeley County, in the state's Eastern Panhandle, by 5,000 votes, which was more than his overall margin of 4,900 votes. Like Charles Town, Berkeley is part of the Washington media market. Mooney was also helped by long coattails from Capito, who carried every county in the state.

Mooney became the first Latino elected to West Virginia's congressional delegation in the state's history.

2016

In 2016, Mooney defeated Republican primary challenger Marc Savitt, 72.9%-27.1%. In the general election, Mooney defeated Democratic state delegate Mark Hunt, 58.2%-41.8%.

2018 
In 2018, Mooney defeated former U.S. State Department official Talley Sergent, 53.9%-43.0%.

2020 
In 2020, Mooney defeated Republican primary challenger Matt Hann, 71.7%-28.3%. In the general election, he defeated energy policy analyst Cathy Kunkel, 63.1%-36.9%.

2022 
West Virginia lost a congressional seat as a result of the 2020 United States Census. The legislature divided the state into northern and southern districts, and abandoned its longtime practice of starting the numbering in the north, assigning the southern counties to the new 1st district. This placed 1st district congressman and fellow Republican David McKinley and Mooney together in the new 2nd district, and both announced plans to run for reelection. Although the new 2nd was geographically more McKinley's district than Mooney's, Mooney won the Republican primary on May 10, 2022.

Tenure
Mooney was sworn in on January 3, 2015. On March 26, 2015, he introduced H.R. 1644, the Supporting Transparent Regulatory and Environmental Actions in Mining Act (STREAM Act). The House passed the bill on January 19, 2016, by a vote of 235–188.

Ethics investigations
In two May 2022 reports, the Office of Congressional Ethics determined that Mooney had "likely violated House rules and federal law" by accepting impermissible gifts and using official resources for personal purposes. The reports found that Mooney and his family had accepted more than $10,800 from a company tied to Mooney on a vacation to Aruba; that Mooney had stayed at a Capitol Hill home owned by the same company's founders for free approximately 20 times from 2015 to 2021, using it for lodging, congressional business, and campaign events; that Mooney had regularly diverted official resources (including staff time) for personal and family matters, and sometimes for campaign activities; and that Mooney had "likely" provided false testimony and withheld evidence in the course of an OCE investigation against him. The OCE transmitted the reports to the House Ethics Committee, which opened an investigation into Mooney's conduct. Mooney denied any misconduct.

Committee assignments
 United States House Committee on Financial Services

Caucus memberships
 Freedom Caucus
Congressional Western Caucus
 Republican Study Committee
Second Amendment Caucus

2024 U.S. Senate election

On November 15, 2022, Mooney announced his candidacy for the U.S. Senate in 2024, seeking to challenge incumbent Democratic senator Joe Manchin.

Political positions

Gold standard
Mooney supports a return to the gold standard.

Foreign and military policy
Mooney was among 60 Republicans to oppose condemning Trump's action of withdrawing forces from Syria. Along with Matt Gaetz and a handful of Republicans, Mooney broke with his party and voted to end assistance to Saudi Arabia in the War in Yemen.

In 2021, Mooney was one of 14 Republican representatives to vote against a resolution condemning the Myanmar coup d'état. It was unclear why Mooney voted against the measure.

In June 2021, Mooney was one of 49 House Republicans to vote to repeal the 2020 Authorization for Use of Military Force Against Iraq.

In 2023, Mooney was among 47 Republicans to vote in favor of H.Con.Res. 21 which directed President Joe Biden to remove U.S. troops from Syria within 180 days.

Marijuana policy
Mooney has a "B" rating from NORML for his voting record on cannabis-related matters.

Immigration
Mooney voted against the Consolidated Appropriations Act (H.R. 1158), which effectively prohibits ICE from cooperating with Health and Human Services to detain or remove illegal alien sponsors of unaccompanied alien children (UACs).

In 2022, NumbersUSA, which seeks to reduce both legal and illegal immigration, gave him a 98% score; in 2019–20, the Federation for American Immigration Reform, which also supports immigration controls, gave him a 100% rating.

Attempts to overturn the 2020 presidential election result
In December 2020, Mooney was one of 126 Republican members of the House of Representatives to sign an amicus brief in support of Texas v. Pennsylvania, a lawsuit filed at the United States Supreme Court contesting the results of the 2020 presidential election, in which Joe Biden defeated incumbent Donald Trump. The Supreme Court declined to hear the case on the basis that Texas lacked standing under Article III of the Constitution to challenge the results of an election held by another state.

Mooney supported Texas v. Pennsylvania, a failed attempt to overturn the 2020 United States presidential election. In the days leading up to the 2021 United States Electoral College vote count, he said he had not decided whether he would vote to certify, choosing to decide on the House Floor after listening to debate. Mooney did not support the objection to Arizona's electoral votes, which was sponsored by Senator Ted Cruz. Mooney was in the House Chamber listening to the certification debate when Trump supporters attacked the United States Capitol. He hid in the gallery with other members of Congress before being removed to a safe place.

After the Capitol was secure and Congress returned to certify the results, Mooney supported the objection to certifying Pennsylvania's electoral votes, as sponsored by Senator Josh Hawley. Mooney claimed that Pennsylvania violated election laws, ignored its constitution and that the "legislature was subverted." In response to his decision, the Charleston Gazette-Mail editorial board charged him with "subverting democracy" and said that he and Representative Carol Miller were complicit in the Capitol attack by their unwavering support of Trump.

On January 11, 2021, the Democrats introduced a resolution to call on Vice President Mike Pence to invoke the Twenty-fifth Amendment to the United States Constitution to remove Trump in response to the attack on the Capitol. When the resolution was presented, Mooney objected, saying that Congress "should not adopt a resolution of this magnitude without any debate on the floor of the U.S. House of Representatives. It is wrong to have sent members of Congress home and then try to adopt without any debate a precedent-setting resolution that could imperil our Republic."

Electoral history

West Virginia

Maryland
 2010 Race for Maryland State Senate – District 3
{|class="wikitable" width="500px"
|-
!Name
!Votes
!Percent
!Outcome
|-
|Ronald N. Young, Dem.
|22,710
|51.1%
|Won
|-
|Alex X. Mooney, Rep.
|21,666
|48.7%
|Lost
|-
|Other Write-Ins
|75
|0.2%
|Lost
|}
 2006 Race for Maryland State Senate – District 3
{|class="wikitable" width="500px"
|-
!Name
!Votes
!Percent
!Outcome
|-
|Alex X. Mooney, Rep.
|21,844
|51.9%
|Won
|-
|Candy O. Greenway, Dem.
|20,111
|47.8%
|Lost
|-
|Other Write-Ins
|104
|0.2%
|Lost
|}
 2002 Race for Maryland State Senate – District 3
{|class="wikitable" width="500px"
|-
!Name
!Votes
!Percent
!Outcome
|-
|Alex X. Mooney, Rep.
|21,617
|55.0%
|Won
|-
|C. Sue Hecht, Dem.
|17,654
|44.9%
|Lost
|-
|Other Write-Ins
|66
|0.2%
|Lost
|}
 1998 Race for Maryland State Senate – District 3
{|class="wikitable" width="500px"
|-
!Name
!Votes
!Percent
!Outcome
|-
|Alex X. Mooney, Rep.
|18,399
|56%
|Won
|-
|Ronald S. Bird, Dem.
|14,212
|44%
|Lost
|}

New Hampshire
 1992 Race for New Hampshire State House – Grafton 10
{|class="wikitable" width="500px"
|-
!Name
!Votes
!Percent
!Outcome
|-
|Sharon Nordgren, Dem.
|3,540
|18.96%
|Won
|-
|Marion L. Copenhaver, Dem.
|3,484
|18.66%
|Won
|-
|Elizabeth L. Crory, Dem.
|3,286
|17.60%
|Won
|-
|Robert Guest, Dem.
|3,219
|17.24%
|Won
|-
|Linde McNamara, Rep.
|1,820
|9.75%
|Lost
|-
|Fred Carleton, Rep.
|1,742
|9.33%
|Lost
|-
|Alex X. Mooney, Rep.
|1,580
|8.46%
|Lost
|}

Personal life
Congressman Alex X. Mooney and his wife, Dr. Grace Mooney, live in Charles Town in Jefferson County with their three children. Their third child, Gabrielle, was born in Charleston, West Virginia in October 2014. Mooney is Roman Catholic.

See also

 List of Hispanic and Latino Americans in the United States Congress

References

External links
 
 Congressman Alex Mooney official U.S. House website
 Official campaign website
 
 
 
 

|-

|-

|-

1971 births
20th-century American politicians
21st-century American politicians
American Roman Catholics
American people of Irish descent
American politicians of Cuban descent
Catholics from West Virginia
Hispanic and Latino American members of the United States Congress
Hispanic and Latino American state legislators in Maryland
Dartmouth College alumni
Living people
Republican Party Maryland state senators
Politicians from Frederick, Maryland
People from Washington, D.C.
Republican Party members of the United States House of Representatives from West Virginia
State political party chairs of Maryland
Candidates in the 2024 United States Senate elections